The New Zealand national badminton team represents New Zealand in international badminton team competitions. The best result the national team has produced on the international stage was being the semifinalist at the Uber Cup in 1960 and 1972 respectively.

It is controlled by Badminton New Zealand, the governing body for badminton in New Zealand. In February 2018, Danish badminton player, Rikke Olsen Siegemund was assigned to be the coach of the national team.

Participation in BWF competitions

Thomas Cup

Uber Cup

Sudirman Cup

Participation in Oceania Badminton Championships

Men's team

Mixed team

Current squad

Men's squad 
The following squad was selected to represent the New Zealand men's team at the 2022 Thomas & Uber Cup.

Women's squad 
The following squad was selected to represent the New Zealand women's team at the 2020 Oceania Badminton Championships.

References

Badminton
National badminton teams
Badminton in New Zealand